Children of the 20th Century is a 2017 South Korean television series starring Han Ye-seul and Kim Ji-suk with Lee Sang-woo, Ryu Hyun-kyung and Lee Sang-hee. The series aired on Mondays and Tuesdays at 22:00 (KST), from October 9 to November 28, 2017.

Synopsis
The story follows three women in their mid-thirties as they navigate their love lives, friendships, and their familial ties.

Cast

Main
 Han Ye-seul as Sa Jin-jin
Kang Mi-na as young Sa Jin-jin 
An idol turned actress adored by many. Despite her good looks and fame, she has not dated before.  
 Kim Ji-suk as Gong Ji-won
Kim In-seong as young Gong Ji-won 
An investment banker with a Harvard MBA, and a background in Wall Street. He is innocent in love and remains loyal to his first love.
Lee Sang-woo as Anthony / Lee Chul-min
Park Seo-ham as young Anthony
A former boy band member of Boys Be Ambitious. Sa Jin-jin's crush since young. He is also Ji-won's step brother. 
 Ryu Hyun-kyung as Han A-reum
Song Soo-hyun as young Han A-reum 
A flight attendant who is constantly on a diet and takes the initiative to ask guys out. 
Lee Sang-hee as Jang Young-shim  
Han Ji-won as young Jang Young-shim 
A lawyer who has had perfect grades since young. 
Ahn Se-ha as Jung Woo-sung 
Kwon Do-kyun as young Jung Woo-sung  
A gynecologist. He was handsome when he was young, but his looks drastically changed after he grew older. He attended the same school as the Four Bongos.
 Oh Sang-jin as Kang Kyung-suk 
A highly principled lawyer who doesn't care for money or glory. Young-shim's boss.

Supporting

People around Jin-jin
 Kim Chang-wan as Sa Chang-wan, Jin-jin's father
 Kim Mi-kyung as Kim Mi-kyung, Jin-jin's mother 
 Shin Won-ho as Sa Min-ho, Jin-jin's younger brother
 Kim Jung-hwa as Sa Ho-sung / Lee Su-hyun, Jin-jin's older sister

Chamjin Entertainment
 Kim Kwang-shik as Jang Gi-bong, Jin-jin's manager
 Lee Jae-kyoon as Lee Hong-hee, Jin-jin's road manager
 Lee Yoo-mi as Mi-dal (Cho Mi-hyun), Jin-jin's stylist

People around Ji-won
 Kim Tae-hoon as Lee Seung-goo, Ji-won's step father 
 Kim Young-sun as Lee Gwang-hee, Ji-won's mother
 Shin Se-hwi as Lee Ha-ram, Ji-won's half-sister 
 Jung Jae-ho as Kim Tae-hyun, Ji-won's assistant

People around A-reum
 Choi Beom-ho as Han Hak-gyu, A-reum's father
 Yoon Bok-in as Yoon Bok-in, A-reum's mother 
 Jang Hee-ryung as Jang Ji-hye, A-reum's colleague 
 Lee Chang-yeob as Lee Dong-hoon, a co-pilot that A-reum had a crush on

People around Young-shim
 Kim Yik-tae as Jang Jang-soo, Young-shim's father
 Park Myung-shin as Kim Young-ja, Young-shim's mother

Others
 Shin Dong-mi as Choi Jung-eun, Anthony's manager
 Shin Dong-hoon as Reporter Jung
 Jo Hyun-sik as Driver

Special appearance
 Han Sun-hwa as Jung Da-young 
 Golden Child as idol group 'Master'
 Heo Ji-woong as Variety Show Host 
 Shim Hyung-tak as Terius / Jung Chang-hoon
 KNK as idol group 'Boys Be Ambitious' (young age)
 Kim So-yeon as Director

Production
The drama's working title was No Sex and the City. It is the debut of Lee Sun-hye as main writer, as she was a junior writer for tvN's Reply series. Directing the series was Lee Dong-yoon (Fated To Love You, The Queen's Classroom, Happy Home).
Due to a strike at MBC, the series did not air on September 25, 2017 as originally planned.

Original soundtrack

Part 1

Part 2

Part 3

Part 4

Part 5

Part 6

Ratings 
In the table below,  represent the lowest ratings and  represent the highest ratings.
NR denotes that the drama did not rank in the top 20 daily programs on that date.

Awards and nominations

Notes

References

External links
  
 
 

2017 South Korean television series debuts
Korean-language television shows
MBC TV television dramas
South Korean romantic comedy television series
2017 South Korean television series endings
Television series by Studio Santa Claus Entertainment